"Du" ("You") is the second single by German rapper Cro. A pop and rap song, it was produced by Cro, and the lyrics and musical composition are also attributed to him. On 29 June 2012, the music video was released. The same day, the single was released on as the second single from his debut album Raop through Chimperator Productions.

Track listing

Charts

Weekly charts

Year-end charts

Certifications

References

External links 
 

2012 singles
Cro (rapper) songs
German-language songs
2012 songs